The 1974–75 Japan Ice Hockey League season was the ninth season of the Japan Ice Hockey League. Six teams participated in the league. Kokudo Keikaku won the championship for the first time.

Regular season

External links
 Japan Ice Hockey Federation

Japan
Japan Ice Hockey League seasons
Japan